The 2014 Segunda División season, was the 69th edition of the second tier of Federación Peruana de Futbol. The tournament was played on a home-and-away round-robin basis.

Teams

Promotion and relegation (pre-season)
A total of 16 teams played in the league, 2 more from the previous season. They include 10 sides from the 2013 season, four from the 2013 Copa Perú, and two relegated from the 2013 Torneo Descentralizado.

Pacífico and José Gálvez were relegated from the 2013 Torneo Descentralizado. Pacífico made an immediately  return to the Segunda División after being promoted the previous year. José Gálvez was relegated for the sixth time after a brief two-year tenure in the top division thus becoming the Peruvian side with the most promotions and relegations in history.
Los Caimanes was promoted to the Torneo Descentralizado as the champion.

The teams which had been relegated from the Segunda División the previous season were Sport Áncash, Alianza Cristiana, and Sportivo Huracán. Both Sport Áncash and Alianza Cristiana were disabled mid-season and relegated to the Copa Perú for outstanding debts with the SAFAP. Sport Huracán retiered for financial reasons and was relegated to the Copa Perú.

Four Copa Perú teams were promoted: Union Huaral, Willy Serrato, Carlos A. Mannucci and Comerciantes Unidos.
Union Huaral was promoted as 2013 Copa Perú runner-up. Willy Serrato, Carlos A. Mannucci and Comerciantes Unidos were invited to fill in the vacated spots after a strict financial analysis.

Stadia and Locations

League table

Results

References

External links 

  
Tournament regulations 
Peruvian Segunda División news at Peru.com 
Peruvian Segunda División statistics and news at Dechalaca.com 
Peruvian Segunda División news at SegundaPerú.com 
 RSSSF

2
2014
2014 in South American second tier football leagues